USS Alexandria (SSN-757), is a  nuclear-powered attack submarine and the third vessel of the United States Navy to be named for both Alexandria, Virginia, and Alexandria, Louisiana. The contract to build her was awarded to the Electric Boat Division of General Dynamics Corporation on 26 November 1984. Her keel was laid down in Groton, Connecticut, on 19 June 1987. She was launched on 23 June 1990, sponsored by Mrs. Myrtle "Tookie" Clark, wife of Vice Admiral Glenwood Clark (ret.), and commissioned on 29 June 1991. Alexandria was placed in service on 22 March 1991. A series of sea trials began 16 April and were completed 4 June.

Service history 
Alexandria, together with the guided-missile cruiser , guided-missile frigate , and P-3C Orion maritime patrol and reconnaissance aircraft, participated in Exercise Malabar 2004, a training exercise with the Indian Navy off the southwest coast of India that ended on 11 October 2004.

The two submarines were taking part in joint testing of submarine operability and tactical development in Arctic waters. On 21 March 2007, Tireless experienced an explosion of a self-contained oxygen generation candle, she suffered only superficial damage, but two crew members were killed and one injured.

Kristian Saucier Incident

On 19 August 2016, Navy machinist mate Kristian Saucier, 29, was sentenced by a U.S. District Court judge in Bridgeport, Connecticut, to one year in prison plus six months house arrest for taking and possessing six cell phone photos of Alexandria's classified propulsion system while working in her engine room in 2009.  Invoking the so-called "Clinton defense," his attorneys had argued for leniency by citing the FBI's decision not to charge Hillary Clinton for similar crimes of mishandling classified information related to her use of a private email server. On 5 September 2017, having received an other-than-honorable discharge from the Navy, Saucier was released from jail.

Film set
Some scenes for the movie Stargate: Continuum were filmed on board Alexandria. The then-captain of Alexandria, Commander Mike Bernacchi, and members of his crew played themselves. The ship was also used as a filming location for the JAG and NCIS TV series, although she was referred to there as the fictional USS Cathedral City.

References

External links 

 
 
 
 
 
 
 
 
 
 
 

Ships built in Groton, Connecticut
Los Angeles-class submarines
Cold War submarines of the United States
Nuclear submarines of the United States Navy
1990 ships
Submarines of the United States